Glyptothorax chindwinica is a species of catfish that was first described by Vishwanath and Linthoingambi 2007. Glyptothorax chindwinica is a species in genus Glyptothorax, family Sisoridae and order Siluriformes. IUCN categorise the species as least concern globally. No subspecies are listed in Catalogue of Life.

References 

Glyptothorax
Taxa named by Waikhom Vishwanath
Fish described in 2007